Hinterland is a feature film written, directed, produced and starring Harry Macqueen. The film was released in UK on 27 February 2015, and was fairly well received, garnering a Rotten Tomatoes score of 70%. It was nominated Best UK Feature at Raindance Film Festival 2014 and Best Debut at the Beijing International Film Festival 2015. It was released by Soda Pictures. It was the UK's first carbon-neutral feature film. The film was picked up by the streaming service MUBI in October 2015.

Plot
When Harvey's (Harry Macqueen) childhood friend Lola (Lori Campbell) returns home after being abroad for many years, he takes her on a road-trip to the sea-side cottage where they spent much of their youth, rekindling their friendship along the way.

Reception
The Telegraph called it 'A transporting debut'., The Guardian 'delicate and affecting', and 'a powerful and courageous masterpiece' by ALT Magazine. Sight & Sound described the film as 'so evocative...filmgoers who like their love stories wistful would be well advised to seek it out'. Mike McCahill wrote 'the film's sincerity and elegance of expression are unquestionable. This work of quiet assurance deserves entry to that select group of 21st century films – Jamie Thraves' The Low Down, Alex Barrett's Life Just Is, perhaps Col Spector's Honeymooner, too – that come close to nailing the way modern British twentysomethings talk, think, feel and muddle through' Movie Mail. In contrast, The Times questioned Macqueen's decision to cast himself in the lead role, while Empire magazine bemoaned the production values.

References

External links
 Official website
 

2014 films
British drama films
2010s English-language films
2010s British films